VOKFM (Voice of Kinabalu FM) is a radio station from Kota Kinabalu, Sabah, Malaysia. The station features local topics by promoting local cultures to younger listeners. They offer a "More Music, Less Talk" concept with a local touch. It was launched on 16 September 2017 during the celebration of Malaysia Day.

Announcers 
The current radio announcers are:
 Rey Kimara 
 Danny Majingga
 Berry Ferhan Shah

Talk Shows 

Music Automation

 Weekdays - 24 HRS

References

External links 
 

2017 establishments in Malaysia
Radio stations established in 2017
Radio stations in Malaysia